Teo Martín Motorsport formerly EV Racing, Emilio de Villota Motorsport, is a Spanish motor racing team, run by Teo Martín and former racing driver Emilio de Villota.

History

E.V. Racing
After retiring from racing, Emilio de Villota formed his own team in 1997, under the name E.V. Racing. The team began by competing in the 2001 Spanish Formula Three Championship, with Daniel Martín, Álvaro Parente, Miguel Ramos and Paul Robinson as drivers. Robinson brought two podiums to the team at Jarama and Estoril. The next year was the most successful in the team's history. Marcel Costa grab the championship title with two wins at Jerez. For the next year the de Villota's son Emilio de Villota Jr. joined team as well as Andy Soucek, who was the only driver to collect podiums for the team in the season. In 2004 the team continued with Andy Soucek, but de Villota Sr. sells its stake in EV Racing and creates Master Junior Formula series.

emiliodevillota.com
In 2007 the team returned to the Spanish Formula Three Championship with Bruno Méndez, who had podiums at Estoril and Jerez. In the final year in the championship under Spanish Formula Three branding, the team had Will Bratt as their only full-time driver. He achieved five podiums to finish the season in seventh in the series standings. In 2009 the main driver of the team was Sergio Canamasas, who had three podiums and ended season in sixth.

De Villota Motorsport
For 2010 the team had signed Fernando Monje and Juan Carlos Sistos, who returned three podium finishes for the team. Also during the 2010 season the team participated in Superleague Formula with cars representing Sevilla FC, AS Roma and Sporting CP. The team continued their collaboration with Sistos in 2011, when he scored four podiums at Algarve, Monza, Jerez and Barcelona. Sistos remained with the team for the third consecutive season and achieved the first win since their return in 2007. But the most successful driver of the team in the season was Måns Grenhagen, who fight for the title with RP Motorsport's drivers Niccolò Schirò and Gianmarco Raimondo.

EmiliodeVillota Motorsport
In 2013 the team had four drivers in the main championship and two drivers in the Cup class. Hector Hurst won the race at Nürburgring and finished seventh in the standings ahead of his teammate Yarin Stern. In 2014 the championship was rebranded as Euroformula Open and the team signed Yu Kanamaru and Che One Lim as their full-time drivers. Kanamaru had four podiums. He stayed in the team for 2015, but this time his teammate was Jose Manuel Vilalta. Kanamaru improved to seven podiums and won race at Silverstone.

Teo Martin Motorsport
Also in 2015, Teo Martín Motorsport was re-established having once been dominant in the Spanish Supertouring Championship, and joined International GT Open championship with McLaren 650S and Álvaro Parente and Miguel Ramos as their drivers. The team won both Championship and Pro-Am standings from their first attempt.

For 2016, Teo Martín purchased DAMS' World Series Formula V8 3.5 entry and cars. Also he joined forces with Emilio de Villota Jr. (who became team principal) and merged teams. Also in 2016 they switched to BMW M6 GT3 cars in the International GT Open, scoring four wins with the both cars, to clinch their first teams' title.

2019 would be the last season for the team in Euroformula, with the sole focus on the 2020 International GT Open season, running three McLaren 720S GT3.

However, a return to single seaters was confirmed with the announcement that the team was joining the 2021 F4 Spanish Championship grid, with Jorge Campos and Filip Jenić.

Current Series Results

F4 Spanish Championship

† Espírito Santo drove for Campos Racing from round 3 onwards.

‡ Nogales drove for Drivex School from round 5 onwards.

TCR Europe Touring Car Series

Timeline

References

External links
 

Spanish auto racing teams
Euroformula Open Championship teams
World Series Formula V8 3.5 teams
International GT Open teams
Superleague Formula teams
Auto racing teams established in 1997
Auto racing teams established in 1998